There It Is is a 1928 silent black-and-white comedy short directed by Harold L. Muller and starring Charles R. Bowers.

Plot summary
The plot centers on Charley MacNeesha, a Scotland Yard detective who carries a stop motion-animated bug assistant called MacGregor in a matchbox. The pair travel to New York City to investigate the "Fuzz-Faced Phantom", who causes full-grown chickens to hatch from eggs, pots to float across rooms, and pants to dance of their own volition.

In 2004, the film was named to the National Film Registry by the Librarian of Congress for its "cultural, aesthetic, or historical significance".

See also
Treasures from American Film Archives

References

External links
There It Is essay  by Steve Massa at National Film Registry
There It Is essay by Daniel Eagan in America's Film Legacy: The Authoritative Guide to the Landmark Movies in the National Film Registry, A&C Black, 2010 , pages 135-136 

 

1928 films
1928 comedy films
American silent short films
United States National Film Registry films
1928 short films
Silent American comedy films
American black-and-white films
American comedy short films
1920s American films